The 1951 Los Angeles Rams season was the team's 14th year in the National Football League and the sixth season in Los Angeles. In 1951, the Rams had an up-and-down season, never winning more than three games in a row, but were able to win eight games and clinch the National Conference after defeating the Green Bay Packers during Week 12 of the season. Los Angeles also led the National Football League in attendance for the second time while in Southern California; the first of 10 consecutive seasons leading the league in attendance. The Rams' largest crowd during the 1951 campaign was 67,186 against the Cleveland Browns during Week 2.

After their 8–5 campaign, Los Angeles won the National Conference and advanced to their third NFL Championship Game in a row and faced the powerhouse Cleveland Browns. The Rams ended up winning their second NFL Championship in seven seasons, and their first in Los Angeles. The 1951 NFL Championship was also the State of California's first major professional championship and was the Rams' only title while in Southern California, until Super Bowl LVI, 70 years later. The Rams would advance to the championship round four more times (1955, Super Bowl XIV, Super Bowl LIII, and Super Bowl LVI).

The Rams scored 391 points, the second-most of any NFL team in the 1950s (although significantly less than the highest-scoring team of the decade, the 1950 Rams). Los Angeles led the league in total points, total yards, passing yards, and was third in the league in rushing. Ram quarterbacks Bob Waterfield and Norm Van Brocklin led the National Football League in quarterback rating, with both in the top three in yards per completion. Elroy "Crazy Legs" Hirsch led in nearly every receiving category (receptions, receiving yards, receiving touchdowns, yards per reception, yards per game, and points scored). While the Rams' offensive statistics were stellar, Los Angeles' defense was middle-of-the pack in the NFL with 261 points and 3,879 yards given up.

Offseason

NFL Draft

 1 (11) – Bud McFadin, Texas, G
 2 (24) – Herb Rich, Vanderbilt, B
 3 (35) – Charlie Toogood, Nebraska, T
 4 (48) – George Kinek, Tulane, B
 5 (59) – Tony Momsen, Michigan, C
 6 (72) – Norb Hecker, Baldwin–Wallace, E
 7 (83) – Alan Egler, Colgate, B
 8 (96) – Hugo Primiani, Boston University, T
 9 (107) – Nolan Lang, Oklahoma, B
 10 (121) – Roland Kirkby, Washington, B
 11 (132) – John Natyshak, Tampa, B
 12 (145) – Don Hardey, Pacific, B
 13 (156) – Joe Reid, Louisiana State, C
 14 (169) – Rob McCoy, Georgia Tech, B
 15 (180) – Obie Posey, Southern, B
 16 (193) – Bill Robertson, Memphis State, E
 17 (204) – Hal Riley, Baylor, E
 18 (217) – Dick Daugherty, Oregon, G
 19 (228) – Andy Robustelli, Arnold, DE
 20 (241) – Jim Nutter, Wichita State, B
 21 (252) – Earl Stelle, Oregon, B
 22 (265) – Billy Baggett, Louisiana State, B
 23 (276) – Dean Thomas, Michigan State, T
 24 (289) – Harry Abeltin, Colgate, T
 25 (300) – Jackie Calvert, Clemson, T
 26 (313) – Howie Ruetz, Loras, T
 27 (324) – Al Brosky, Illinois, B
 28 (337) – Sterling Wingo, Virginia Tech, B
 29 (348) – Earl Jackson, Texas Tech, B
 30 (361) – Alvin Hanley, Kentucky State, B

Preseason

Schedule

Regular season

Schedule

Week 1
Week one of the 1951 season for the Los Angeles Rams was an exercise in complete domination over the hapless New York Yanks at the Los Angeles Coliseum. Los Angeles jumped out to a 34–0 lead before allowing a New York touchdown in the second quarter and would have likely held the Yanks to only 7 points if it were not for a 30-yard fumble return in the fourth quarter. Ram quarterback Norm Van Brocklin sliced up the New York defense, throwing for 554 yards with five touchdown passes and three different Los Angeles receivers also had over 100 yards receiving. This was the first of two home for the Rams against the now-defunct Yanks, who had to play eight of their 12 games on the road.

Week 2
Week two saw the Rams face the then-powerhouse Cleveland Browns, winners of five straight league championships (4 AAFC, 1 NFL), in front of 67,186 at the Los Angeles Coliseum. The game started well enough for Los Angeles, jumping out to a 10–0 lead and holding a 10–7 lead at halftime. The Browns, however, stormed out of the gate in the third quarter with 21 points to essentially salt away the eventual National Conference champion Rams. Los Angeles would eventually get a rematch with the eventual American Conference champion Browns in the NFL Championship Game and were able to defeat the powerhouse Browns the second time around.

Week 3

Week 4

Week 5
With Los Angeles heading into their rivalry game with the San Francisco 49ers on a two-game winning streak and a 3–1 record, the Rams were confident heading into Kezar Stadium in San Francisco. The Rams, however, were shocked by the rival 49ers 44–17. San Francisco exploded for four touchdowns (28 points) in the second quarter, effectively ending the game right there. The lone bright spot in the game for the Rams was the continued excellent play by Elroy "Crazy Legs" Hirsch with seven receptions, 163 yards, and one touchdown.

Week 6
After being embarrassed on the road in San Francisco, the Rams returned home to the Los Angeles Memorial Coliseum to face the very same 49ers that defeated them a week earlier. This meeting, however, ended with a Los Angeles victory. The Rams had a 13–7 lead heading into halftime, but the third quarter saw San Francisco tie the game at 13 (after a missed PAT) and then early in the fourth quarter take the lead. Los Angeles responded after the 49ers took the lead and rattled off 10 points in the fourth quarter to salt the game away.

Week 7

Standings

Postseason

NFL Championship Game

The Rams were the first to score with a 1-yard run by fullback Dick Hoerner in the second quarter. The Browns answered back with an NFL Championship record 52-yard field goal by Lou Groza. They later took the lead with a 17-yard touchdown pass from Otto Graham to Dub Jones. The Browns led at halftime 10–7.

In the third quarter Larry Brink landed a hard tackle on Graham causing him to fumble the ball. Andy Robustelli picked up the ball on the Cleveland 24 and returned it to the Cleveland 2. On the third play of the drive, "Deacon" Dan Towler ran the ball in for a touchdown from the one-yard line giving the Rams a 14–10 lead.

Early in the fourth quarter, the Rams increased their lead with a Bob Waterfield 17-yard field goal. The Browns answered back with an 8-play, 70-yard drive that ended with a 5-yard touchdown run by Ken Carpenter, tying the game at 17–17. Twenty-five seconds later, late in the fourth quarter, Tom Fears beat defenders Cliff Lewis and Tommy James and received a Norm Van Brocklin pass at midfield. Fears raced to the endzone for a 73-yard touchdown, securing a Rams 24–17 win and the 1951 NFL title.

Coaching staff

Final roster

External links
 Rams on jt-sw.com
 Rams on Database Football
 Rams on Pro Football Reference

References

Los Angeles Rams
Los Angeles Rams seasons
National Football League championship seasons
Los Angeles